Lucien Parker Emerson (May 5, 1890 – March 1, 1980) was a basketball coach, football referee, and baseball club secretary. He coached high school basketball in the 1920s, including Hume-Fogg High School's girls' basketball team, and won a state title coaching men's basketball at Montgomery Bell Academy. Emerson coached Sewanee basketball from 1928 to 1930, posting a record of 17–28 (.378). He was secretary of the Nashville Vols baseball club from 1926 to 1928, and for the Chattanooga team afterwards.

References 

1890 births
Sportspeople from Louisville, Kentucky
Sewanee Tigers men's basketball coaches
1980 deaths
American football officials
Nashville Vols
High school basketball coaches in Tennessee